Plesiocystiscus violaceous is a species of very small sea snail, a marine gastropod mollusc or micromollusk in the family Cystiscidae.

Description
The length of the shell attains 2.6 mm.

Distribution
The species is endemic to São Tomé and Príncipe.

References

External links
[http://science.mnhn.fr/institution/mnhn/collection/im/item/2000-26621?lang=fr_FR Photo of Plesiocystiscus violaceus] at MNHN 

Cystiscidae
Endemic fauna of São Tomé and Príncipe
Invertebrates of São Tomé and Príncipe
Gastropods described in 2014